Boro is a rural locality of New South Wales, Australia in the Queanbeyan-Palerang Region, near the village of Tarago, about 50 km south of Goulburn. The name is a variation of the Aboriginal bora ring.

Boro Creek is a tributary of the Shoalhaven River.

The bushranger, William Westwood, known as "Jackey Jackey", operated in the area.

Silver was mined in the area and there are a number of mining relics and shafts around.

Footnotes

Towns in New South Wales
Queanbeyan–Palerang Regional Council